An All-American team is an honorary sports team composed of the best amateur players of a specific season for each team position—who in turn are given the honorific "All-America" and typically referred to as "All-American athletes", or simply "All-Americans". Although the honorees generally do not compete together as a unit, the term is used in U.S. team sports to refer to players who are selected by members of the national media.  Walter Camp selected the first All-America team in the early days of American football in 1889.  The 2017 NCAA Men's Basketball All-Americans are honorary lists that include All-American selections from the Associated Press (AP), the United States Basketball Writers Association (USBWA), the Sporting News (TSN), and the National Association of Basketball Coaches (NABC) for the 2016–17 NCAA Division I men's basketball season. All selectors choose at least a first and second 5-man team. The NABC, TSN and AP choose third teams, while AP also lists honorable mention selections.

The Consensus 2017 College Basketball All-American team is determined by aggregating the results of the four major All-American teams as determined by the National Collegiate Athletic Association (NCAA). Since United Press International was replaced by TSN in 1997, the four major selectors have been the aforementioned ones. AP has been a selector since 1948, NABC since 1957 and USBWA since 1960.  To earn "consensus" status, a player must win honors based on a point system computed from the four different all-America teams. The point system consists of three points for first team, two points for second team and one point for third team. No honorable mention or fourth team or lower are used in the computation. The top five totals plus ties are first team and the next five plus ties are second team.

Although the aforementioned lists are used to determine consensus honors, there are numerous other All-American lists. The ten finalists for the John Wooden Award are described as Wooden All-Americans. The ten finalists for the Senior CLASS Award are described as Senior All-Americans.  Other All-American lists include those determined by USA Today, Fox Sports, Yahoo! Sports and many others. The scholar-athletes selected by College Sports Information Directors of America (CoSIDA) are termed Academic All-Americans.

2017 Consensus All-America team
PG – Point guard
SG – Shooting guard
PF – Power forward
SF – Small forward
C – Center

Individual All-America teams

By player

By team

AP Honorable Mention:

Ian Baker, New Mexico State
Trae Bell-Haynes, Vermont
Evan Bradds, Belmont
Gian Clavell, Colorado State
T. J. Cline, Richmond
Patrick Cole, North Carolina Central
Mike Daum, South Dakota State
Angel Delgado, Seton Hall
Jawun Evans, Oklahoma State
Nana Foulland, Bucknell
De'Aaron Fox, Kentucky
Jerome Frink, LIU Brooklyn
Kevin Hervey, Texas–Arlington
Isaiah Johnson, Akron
Keon Johnson, Winthrop
Peter Jok, Iowa
Przemek Karnowski, Gonzaga
Marcus Keene, Central Michigan
Jock Landale, Saint Mary's
T. J. Leaf, UCLA
Paris Lee, Illinois State
Zach Lofton, Texas Southern
Donovan Mitchell, Louisville
Dallas Moore, North Florida
Monte Morris, Iowa State
Luke Nelson, UC Irvine
Semi Ojeleye, SMU
Alec Peters, Valparaiso
Justin Robinson, Monmouth
Devin Sibley, Furman
Dennis Smith Jr., NC State
Erik Thomas, New Orleans
Sindarius Thornwell, South Carolina
Melo Trimble, Maryland
Spencer Weisz, Princeton
Jacob Wiley, Eastern Washington
JaCorey Williams, Middle Tennessee
T. J. Williams, Northeastern

Academic All-Americans
On March 2, 2017, the College Sports Information Directors of America (CoSIDA) announced the 2017 Academic All-America team, with Canyon Barry (youngest son of Hall of Famer Rick Barry) headlining the NCAA Division I team as the men's college basketball Academic All-American of the Year.  The following is the 2016–17 Academic All-America Division I Men’s Basketball Team as selected by CoSIDA:

Senior All-Americans
The ten finalists for the Senior CLASS Award are called Senior All-Americans. The 10 honorees are as follows, divided into first and second teams with the winner highlighted in bold text:

First team

Second team

References

All-Americans
NCAA Men's Basketball All-Americans